Valdese is a town in Burke County, North Carolina, United States. The population was 4,689 at the 2020 census. It is part of the Hickory-Lenoir-Morganton Metropolitan Statistical Area. One of the largest Waldensian congregations in the United States was founded in the town in the late nineteenth century, now known as the Waldensian Presbyterian Church. The town was settled by immigrants from the Cottian Alps in the Piedmont region of Italy.

History
Settled in 1893 by a group of Waldensians from Northern Italy, the town was incorporated in 1920.

In addition to Waldensian Presbyterian Church, the Jean-Pierre Auguste Dalmas House and Valdese Elementary School are listed on the National Register of Historic Places.

The Valdese News, a newspaper serving Burke County, was published there from 1938 through 1950.

Geography
Valdese is located in eastern Burke County at  (35.743270, -81.558662). It is bordered to the east by the town of Rutherford College.

U.S. Route 70 passes through the town as Main Street, leading west  to the center of Morganton, the county seat, and east  to Hickory. Interstate 40 runs along the southern border of the town, providing access from exits 111 and 112.

Demographics

2020 census

As of the 2020 United States census, there were 4,689 people, 1,545 households, and 1,104 families residing in the town.

2000 census
As of the census of 2000, there were 4,485 people, 1,886 households, and 1,180 families residing in the town. The population density was 823.8 people per square mile (318.3/km2). There were 1,992 housing units at an average density of 365.9 per square mile (141.4/km2). The racial makeup of the town was 91.53% White, 1.05% African American, 0.22% Native American, 3.99% Asian, 0.07% Pacific Islander, 2.25% from other races, and 0.89% from two or more races. Hispanic or Latino of any race were 4.91% of the population.

There were 1,886 households, out of which 28.3% had children under the age of 18 living with them, 46.5% were married couples living together, 12.0% had a female householder with no husband present, and 37.4% were non-families. 33.8% of all households were made up of individuals, and 16.5% had someone living alone who was 65 years of age or older. The average household size was 2.29 and the average family size was 2.90.

In the town, the population was spread out, with 23.5% under the age of 18, 7.0% from 18 to 24, 26.8% from 25 to 44, 22.1% from 45 to 64, and 20.6% who were 65 years of age or older. The median age was 40 years. For every 100 females, there were 83.7 males. For every 100 females age 18 and over, there were 78.6 males.

The median income for a household in the town was $30,617, and the median income for a family was $41,411. Males had a median income of $27,482 versus $22,429 for females. The per capita income for the town was $18,965. About 8.3% of families and 11.9% of the population were below the poverty line, including 15.7% of those under age 18 and 11.5% of those age 65 or over.

There is also an Occitan-speaking community.

Notable people
 Hugh Blackwell, member of the North Carolina House of Representatives
 Bill Cline, Canadian Football League (CFL) player
 Doug Cline, American Football League (AFL) linebacker for the Houston Oilers and San Diego Chargers
 J. Bazzel Mull, Christian minister and religious broadcaster in East Tennessee 
 Stanley Pons, electrochemist
 Tyler Shatley, NFL offensive guard for the Jacksonville Jaguars
 George Shuffler, bluegrass musician

Sister city
Valdese has one sister city, as designated by Sister Cities International:
 Torre Pellice, Italy

References

External links

 Town website

Waldensianism
Italian-American culture in North Carolina
Populated places established in 1893
Towns in Burke County, North Carolina
North Carolina populated places on the Catawba River